Pam Marsden is a former netball player who played for New Zealand's gold medal-winning team in the 1967 World Netball Championships.

Netball Career
Pam Marsden (née Hamilton) was born on 5 June 1941. She played basketball for Auckland before being selected for the Silver Ferns, the national netball team, to play in the 1967 world championships, which were held in Perth, Western Australia. She played in the Goal keeper (GK) and Goal defence (GD) positions. Her first game for her country was against South Africa in the world championships on 14 August 1967. New Zealand won the championships, beating Australia 40–34 in the deciding match. Marsden also played for the Silver Ferns in 1969, playing for her country for a total of 8 occasions.

References

1941 births
Living people
New Zealand international netball players
1967 World Netball Championships players